The Luzerne County Transportation Authority (LCTA) is the operator of mass transportation  in the city of Wilkes-Barre, Pennsylvania, and portions of surrounding Luzerne County.  Services provided by the LCTA replaced previously offered services of the White Transit Company and Wilkes-Barre Transit Corporation, under a purchase-of-service agreement in 1972.

The LCTA is governed by a nine-member board, appointed by the Luzerne County Council. On August 1, 2019 LCTA was renamed the Northeast Pennsylvania Transportation Authority.

Routes
The LCTA operates 15 routes weekdays and Saturdays, serving the urban area of Wilkes-Barre and the surrounding Luzerne County in Pennsylvania.  An additional route serves as an inter-city route between Wilkes-Barre and Scranton.

As of July 6, 2010, LCTA routes originate at the James F. Conahan Intermodal Transportation Center on Washington Street near Public Square. The LCTA shares the bus boarding platforms with Martz Trailways. Before the move, the LCTA began trips at Public Square, as it had since its inception in 1972.

  1 Miners Mills
  3 Grove & Brown/Heights
  5 Parsons
  6 Dallas
  7 Georgetown
  8 Swoyersville
  10 Wyoming Valley Mall
  11 West Pittston
  12 Larksville
  13 Ashley/Sugar Notch
  14 Nanticoke via Glen Lyon
  15 Nanticoke via Middle Road
  16 Old Forge
  17 Wilkes-Barre - Wyoming Valley Mall - Steamtown Mall (Scranton)
  18 Shoppers Delight 
  22 Plymouth via Old River Road

LCTA buses connect in Pittston Township and Old Forge to County of Lackawanna Transit System buses.

Operating Fleet
LCTA operates 38 transit buses in its fleet.  The fleet is a mix of Gillig coaches, in 30, 35 and 40 foot variations; and in their Phantom, Advantage and BRT models.

References

External links
LCTA Home

Bus transportation in Pennsylvania
Municipal authorities in Pennsylvania
Transportation in Luzerne County, Pennsylvania
Paratransit services in the United States
1972 establishments in Pennsylvania